Shaul Yahalom (born 27 September 1947) is a former Israeli politician who served as a member of the Knesset between 1992 and 2006 for the National Religious Party.

Biography
Born in Tel Aviv during the Mandate era, Yahalom studied education and economics at Bar-Ilan University, gaining a BA, before working as a journalist. He eventually became a member of the board of directors at the religious Zionist HaTzofe newspaper.

In 1987 he became the National Religious Party's political secretary, a role he held until 1995. He was first elected to the Knesset in the 1992 elections. In 1998, he was appointed Minister of Transportation. He lost his seat in the 2006 elections when the party was reduced to three seats.

Today, he is a member of the board of the Ariel University Center of Samaria.

He is married and has four children.

References

External links

1947 births
Living people
Ariel University
Bar-Ilan University alumni
Deputy ministers of Israel
Israeli journalists
Jewish Israeli politicians
Ministers of Transport of Israel
National Religious Party politicians
Members of the 13th Knesset (1992–1996)
Members of the 14th Knesset (1996–1999)
Members of the 15th Knesset (1999–2003)
Members of the 16th Knesset (2003–2006)
People from Tel Aviv
Restaurant critics